Mosman High School, (abbreviation MHS) is a school located in Mosman, New South Wales, Australia, on Military Road. It is a co-educational high school operated by the New South Wales Department of Education with students from years 7 to 12. The school was established in 1961 and is one of the few state schools in NSW that has no school uniform.

History
Established in January 1961, the campus site of Mosman High was originally the site of Mosman Public School, with the first building constructed in 1883. In February 1921, Mosman Public School was upgraded to the status of an Intermediate High School. In August 1961, the Department of Education announced that the Mosman Home Science School and the Boys' Intermediate High School were to be amalgamated to form the co-educational Mosman High School. The first Principal was Harold James Hamnett, who served until 1964 when he was appointed Principal of Crows Nest Boys High School. From 1961 the site was shared between the schools until 1968 when Mosman Public School moved to a new site bordered by Belmont Road, Myahgah Street and Gouldsbury Street. In the 1980s, in order to distinguish themselves from nearby private schools (Mosman being one of the wealthiest suburbs in Sydney), and after requests from the majority of the pupils and parents at the time to allow pupils to express their individuality through clothing, the school decided to dispense with their traditional school uniforms, making Mosman High one of only two state high schools without a prescribed uniform.

Notable alumni
 Shimon Moore – Singer/songwriter 
 Maeve Dermody – Australian actress
 Naomi Watts – British-Australian actress
 Simon Day – Lead singer of Ratcat
 MC Opi – British-Australian Music Artist
 Barton Lynch – Surfing world champion 1988
 Ken Done AM – Artist
 Nik Fish – DJ
 Flume (musician) - Musician
 Saskia Burmeister - Actress
 Andrew Mueller - Journalist and author
 David Le'aupepe - Musician
 Erin McKinnon - AFLW player
 Christian Anthony - Musician Chase Atlantic
 William Bowden - Grammy Award Winning Mastering Engineer

See also
 List of government schools in New South Wales
 Electoral district of North Shore
 Division of Warringah
 Mosman Municipality

References

External links 
 Mosman High School website
 New South Wales Department of Education – Mosman High School

Public high schools in Sydney
1961 establishments in Australia
Educational institutions established in 1961
Mosman, New South Wales